The Carrizo Mountains (36°50' N, 109°7'W) is a small, mostly circular mountain range 15 to 20 km (9 to 12 miles) in diameter located on the Colorado Plateau in northeastern Arizona.

The mountains are within the Navajo Nation. Teec Nos Pos, Arizona, the closest community, is adjacent at the northern foothills, on Teec Nos Pos Wash, from Pastora Peak, about 5-mi miles to the north from the mountain's perimeter; Teec Nos Pos had about 800 inhabitants in the 2000 census.

Geology 

The Carrizo Mountains primarily consist of igneous rocks that intruded Permian through Cretaceous marine strata. The most common igneous rock type is porphyritic hornblende diorite. Intrusive forms include laccoliths, stocks, sills, and dikes. Ages of the igneous rocks range from 70 to 74 million years.

Similar igneous-cored ranges of the Colorado Plateau, including the Henry Mountains, Abajo Mountains and La Sal Range, formed ca. 31 to 20 million years ago, making them distinctly younger than the late Cretaceous intrusions of the Carrizo Mountains. Radiometric ages of igneous intrusions in Sleeping Ute Mountain are essentially identical to those of the diorite intrusions in the Carrizos.  Both the Carrizo Mountains and Sleeping Ute Mountain are located along the southwest extension of the Colorado Mineral Belt, a 250-mile long lineament characterized by igneous rocks associated with abundant ore deposits.  Large ore deposits have not been found in the igneous rocks of the Carrizo Mountains, although small deposits of uranium, vanadium, copper and silver have been found in the sedimentary rocks of the Morrison Formation.

References 

 
 
 

Geography of the Navajo Nation
Mountain ranges of Apache County, Arizona
Mountain ranges of Arizona